The 1895 Princeton Tigers football team represented Princeton University in the 1895 college football season. The team finished with a 10–1–1 record.  The Tigers recorded nine shutouts and outscored opponents by a combined score of 224 to 28.   The team's sole loss was in the last game of the season by a 20–10 score against Yale.

Two Princeton players, tackle Langdon Lea and guard Dudley Riggs, were consensus first-team honorees on the 1895 College Football All-America Team.

Schedule

References

Princeton
Princeton Tigers football seasons
Princeton Tigers football